Lansing United was an American amateur soccer club based in East Lansing, Michigan that competed in the Premier Development League and the National Premier Soccer League. The club's men's team folded after the 2018 season, with Lansing Ignite FC beginning play in USL League One. The club continued to field a women's team in United Women's Soccer.

History

Club Beginnings (2013–2017)
Lansing United was accepted into the National Premier Soccer League's Great Lakes West Conference of the Midwest Region in Fall of 2013. Ideas for names were solicited from the Greater Lansing community, and Lansing United was chosen. The club motto is  "Pride, Passion and Unity" and is reflected in the team's logo, with the star representing pride, the flame representing passion, and the gear representing unity. The club also uses the Latin phrase "Coniunctis Viribus" which means "With Connected Strength."

Lansing United played its inaugural match in the NPSL in May 2014. They finished the regular season by winning the Great Lakes West championship. United went on to win the NPSL's Midwest Region Playoffs before ultimately losing in the semi-finals to eventual champion, New York Red Bulls U-23s.

The following year, the club secured its first U.S. Open Cup victory over Chicago's RWB Adria, before falling 1–0 to Louisville City FC of the USL.

Both the 2016 & 2017 seasons saw United finish mid-table despite promising starts to each campaign.

Premier Development League & United Women's Soccer (2017–2018)
Beginning in May 2018, Lansing United fielded both men's and women's squads. Lansing United men began competing in the United Soccer Leagues' Premier Development League after four years in the NPSL. They played in the Great Lakes Division of the Central Conference. Lansing United Women also began competition in the Midwest Division of United Women's Soccer.

Stadium 
The team played its home matches at Archer Stadium located in the East Lansing Soccer Complex. On July 9, 2017, a facility-record 1,388 people watched the team take on Detroit City FC.

United sometimes played at DeMartin Stadium on the Michigan State University campus, to facilitate larger crowds. A club-record, 2,014 people watched United secure the Great Lakes West championship over Detroit City FC on July 13, 2014.

Head coaches 
 Eric Rudland (2014–2015)
 Nate Miller (2015–2018)

Notable Lansing United Players
 Matt Brown formerly of R.C.S. Verviétois, current Youth Coach at Chelsea F.C.
 Brian Cunningham formerly of Harbour View F.C., Waitakere United
 Thabiso Khumalo formerly of D.C. United
 Tyler Pasher currently with Houston Dynamo
 Lewis Jones, member of British Virgin Islands national football team
 Lukas Muszong currently with Bremer SV

Honors

Domestic League
 Midwest Region – Great Lakes West Conference (NPSL)
 Champions (1): 2014
 Midwest Region (NPSL)
 Playoff champions (1): 2014

Team Records
As of July 20, 2018

Year-by-year

All-Time Appearances

All-Time Goals

All-Time Assists

All-Time Clean Sheets

Historic Record vs Opponents 

Does not include friendlies
Updated to end of 2017 season
Notes

References

External links
 Official team site

Association football clubs established in 2014
Soccer clubs in Michigan
2014 establishments in Michigan
USL League Two teams
United Women's Soccer
Sports in Lansing, Michigan